This is a list of notable  individuals and organizations who voiced their endorsement of Bernie Sanders as the Democratic Party's presidential nominee for the 2016 U.S. presidential election.

Primary campaign endorsements

U.S. Cabinet members and Cabinet-level officials

Former
 Robert Reich, 22nd Secretary of Labor (1993–1997)

U.S. Senators

Current
 Jeff Merkley, OR

Former
 Mike Gravel, AK (1969–1981)
 Paul G. Kirk, MA (2009–2010)
 Don Riegle, MI (1976–1995)

U.S. Representatives

Current

Former

State and territorial governors

Former
 Aníbal Acevedo Vilá, 9th Governor of Puerto Rico (2005–2009)
 Jesse Ventura, 38th Governor of Minnesota (1999–2003)
 John Kitzhaber, Governor of Oregon (1995–2003; 2011–2015)

State executive officials

Current

Former

State legislators

Current

Former

Tribal leaders and officials

Mayors

Current

Former

Municipal officials

Current

Former

Democratic National Committee members

Current

Former
 Severin Beliveau, former ME Dem. Party Chair
 Bill Press, former CA Dem. Party Chair
 Dick Harpootlian, former South Carolina Democratic Party Chair
 Paul G. Kirk, Chairman of the DNC (1985–1989)

International politicians

Heads of state and government
 Nicolás Maduro, 65th President of Venezuela (United Socialist Party of Venezuela)
 Evo Morales, 80th President of Bolivia (Movement for Socialism)

National and Supranational Ministers and Secretaries

Members of National and Supranational Parliaments

Regional Ministers, Legislators, and Party Leaders

Notable individuals

Activists, humanitarians, and labor leaders

Democratic Party figures

Government officials

Journalists and commentators

Leaders in business

Scholars and critics

Writers, filmmakers and visual artists

Celebrities

Actors

Comedians

Athletes and sports figures

Media personalities and socialites

Voice artists and musicians

Newspapers and other media

Labor organizations

National

State, regional, and local divisions

Organizations

See also
 List of Donald Trump presidential campaign endorsements, 2016
 List of Gary Johnson presidential campaign endorsements, 2016
 List of Hillary Clinton presidential campaign political endorsements, 2016
 List of Hillary Clinton presidential campaign non-political endorsements, 2016
 List of Jill Stein presidential campaign endorsements, 2016
 List of Bernie Sanders presidential campaign endorsements, 2020

References

Endorsements
Sanders, Bernie
Sanders, Bernie, 2016